The Delta State Statesmen and Lady Statesmen are the athletic teams that represent Delta State University, located in Cleveland, Mississippi, in intercollegiate sports at the Division II level of the National Collegiate Athletic Association (NCAA). The Statesmen have primarily competed in the Gulf South Conference since the 1970–71 academic year.

Delta State competes in 15 intercollegiate varsity sports. Men's sports include baseball, basketball, cheerleading, football, golf, soccer, swimming and diving, and tennis; while women's sports include basketball, cheerleading, cross country, soccer, softball, swimming and diving, and tennis.

Conference affiliations 
 Gulf South Conference (1970–present)

Varsity teams

Baseball

National Championships

Draft
Delta State has had 34 Major League Baseball Draft selections since the draft began in 1965.

Football
 For the current season, see 2022 Delta State Statesmen football team.

Program achievements

Women's basketball

The Lady Statesman began play in 1925. They are the only Division II team with 1,000 wins. They play in the Gulf South Conference. Delta State plays their home games at Walter Sillers Coliseum. They have made the NCAA Tournament 27 times, with a record of 57–25. They are coached by Craig Roden. Margaret Wade coached them to three AIAW National titles, while Lloyd Clark coached them to three Division II titles.

AIAW Championships

NCAA Division II Championships

Notable alumni

Baseball 
 Trent Giambrone
 Greg Goff
 Brent Leach

Football 
 George Chesser
 Pete Golding
 Jack Gregory
 Mark Hudspeth
 Anthony Maddox
 Aubrey Matthews
 Wilbur Myers
 Aubrey Rozzell

Men's basketball 
 Thermon Blacklidge
 Sam Little
 Todd Mundt
 Scott Nagy
 Chico Potts
 Jeremy Richardson

Women's swimming and diving 
 Gabriela Santis

References

External links